Kakunyo (覚如) (1270-1351) is the great-grandson of Shinran, founder of Jōdo Shinshū Buddhism, and the third caretaker, or Monshu of the family mausoleum, which gradually became the Hongan-ji Temple in Kyoto, Japan. He was responsible for being the first to compile information about Shinran's life, and formalizing the new Jōdo Shinshū sect, while re-asserting power at the mausoleum away from Shinshu followers in the Kantō region.

Mahayana Buddhists
Jōdo Shinshū
Jōdo Shinshū Buddhist priests
Kamakura period Buddhist clergy